Netherlands participated in the 2010 Summer Youth Olympics in Singapore.

The Dutch squad consisted of 36 athletes competing in 10 sports: aquatics (swimming), archery, badminton, cycling, gymnastics, field hockey, judo, rowing, sailing and table tennis.

Medalists

Archery

Boys

Girls

Mixed Team

Badminton

Boys

Girls

Cycling

Cross Country

Time Trial

BMX

Road Race

Overall

 * Received -5 for finishing road race with all three racers

Gymnastics

Artistic Gymnastics

Boys

Girls

Trampoline

Field hockey

Judo

Individual

Rowing

Sailing

One Person Dinghy

Windsurfing

Swimming

Table tennis

Individual

Team

References

External links

Competitors List: Netherlands

2010 in Dutch sport
Nations at the 2010 Summer Youth Olympics
Netherlands at the Youth Olympics